USS Cincinnati (SSN-693), a , was the fourth ship of the United States Navy to be named for Cincinnati, Ohio. The contract to build her was awarded to Newport News Shipbuilding and Dry Dock Company in Newport News, Virginia on 4 February 1971 and her keel was laid down on 6 April 1974. She was launched on 19 February 1977 sponsored by Mrs. William J. Keating, and commissioned on 10 June 1978.

In November 1980, after a patrol in the Mediterranean Sea, Cincinnati was visited by former President of the United States Richard M. Nixon and Admiral Hyman Rickover.

In 1981, Cincinnati, under the command of Commander Kurt T. Juroff USN, conducted an around the world cruise, steaming 60,000 miles and operating in the Indian Ocean. From 8–13 June 1981 Cincinnati visited Western Australia, docking at HMAS Stirling, Rockingham for an R&R visit.

Cincinnati was decommissioned and stricken from the Naval Vessel Register on 29 July 1996. Ex-Cincinnati was scheduled to enter the Nuclear Powered Ship and Submarine Recycling Program in Bremerton, Washington. After an attempt made to preserve her as a museum and memorial in her namesake city failed, the city now plans on acquiring the sail and other artifacts for display on the riverfront.

A portion of the submarine, the nuclear reactor compartment, was transported via river barge to Hanford, Washington in September 2014 for disposal.

References 
This article includes information collected from the Naval Vessel Register as well as various press releases and news stories.

Los Angeles-class submarines
Cold War submarines of the United States
Nuclear submarines of the United States Navy
History of Cincinnati
1977 ships
Ships built in Newport News, Virginia